North Ottawa County USD 239 is a public unified school district headquartered in Minneapolis, Kansas, United States.  The district includes the communities of Minneapolis, Delphos, Ada, Lindsey, Sumnerville, Wells, and nearby rural areas.

Schools
The school district operates the following schools:
 Minneapolis High School
 Minneapolis Elementary School

See also
 Kansas State Department of Education
 Kansas State High School Activities Association
 List of high schools in Kansas
 List of unified school districts in Kansas

References

External links
 

School districts in Kansas